Phillipsiidae is a family of proetid trilobites, the various genera of which comprise some of the last of the trilobites, with a range that extended from the Kinderhookian epoch of the Lower Mississippian, to the end of Changhsingian age at Permian-Triassic extinction event in the latest Permian period.

Phillipsiidae is sometimes defined as a subfamily, "Phillipsiinae," and usually placed within the  family Proetidae. Jell & Adrain (2003) went so far as to lump Phillipsiidae into the family Proetidae, however other workers since like Lerosey-Aubril and Feist (2005) have continued to recognize Phillipsiidae as a distinct and separate family within Proetida.

Subfamilies 
The following genera are included, divided among six subfamilies:

Phillipsia (type genus)
Breviphillipsia
Comptonaspis
Griffithidella
Hesslerides
Kollarcephalus
Nunnaspis
Phillibole
Piltonia

Subfamily Archegoninae 
Archegonus
Hildaphillipsia

Subfamily Bollandiinae 
Bollandia
Kathwaia
Neoproetus

Subfamily Cummingellinae 
Bedicella
Cummingella
Paraphillipsia
Persia

Subfamily Cyrtosymbolinae 
Carbonocoryphe
Cyrtosymbole

Subfamily Ditomopyginae 
Acanthophillipsia
Acropyge
Ameropiltonia
Ameura
Ampulliglabella
Australokaskia
Anisopyge
Delaria
Ditomopyge
Hentigia
Iranaspidion
Jimbokranion
Malchi
Microphillipsia
Novoameura
Planokaskia
Permoproetus
Pseudophillipsia
Simulopaladin
Timoraspis
Vidria

Subfamily Thaiaspidinae 
Thaiaspis
Thigriffides

Subfamily Weaniinae 
Doublatia
Endops
Nipponaspis
Weania

References

Bresinski, David K 2000. Lower Mississippian Trilobites from Southern New Mexico. Jour. Paleontology V74(6), 1043-1965
 Phillipsiidae - Paleodb 9/2/11
 Proetida fact sheet

Proetida
 
Carboniferous trilobites
Permian trilobites
Mississippian first appearances
Guadalupian extinctions
Prehistoric arthropod families
Trilobite families